General Pennington may refer to:

Alexander Cummings McWhorter Pennington Jr. (1838–1917), U.S. Army brigadier general
Jeffrey T. Pennington (fl, 1980s–2020s), U.S. Air Force major general
Lowther Pennington, 2nd Baron Muncaster (1745–1818), British Army general